Chantal Mauduit (24 March 1964 – 13 May 1998) was a French alpinist.

Biography
Born in Paris, Mauduit arrived in the French Alps at age five and started climbing at the age of 15. After several difficult routes in the Alps, she focused her attention on the Andes, and then the Himalayas, where she climbed K2 (1992; fourth woman overall), Shisha Pangma (1993), Cho Oyu (1993), Lhotse (1996; first woman solo), Manaslu (1996), and Gasherbrum II (1997), all without supplemental oxygen.

Along with her Sherpa partner Ang Tsering, she was killed at Camp II on Dhaulagiri on May 11, 1998. Her body was returned to France and the autopsy concluded that the cause of death was a broken neck.

In honor of her generosity, her friends and family created a foundation to help needy Nepalese children, especially girls and those in need of schooling: The Association Chantal Mauduit Namasté. Created by the Association, the Chantal Mauduit School in Kathmandu now enrolls 200 children.

Controversy
Mauduit needed to be rescued by Ed Viesturs and Scott Fischer on descent from K2 in 1992, Viesturs and Fischer gave up their own summit attempt of K2 at the time in order to get Mauduit, who had become snow blind, to safety.

After collapsing during a failed summit attempt on Mount Everest in 1995, Mauduit was carried off the mountain by other climbers. Some climbers, including Viesturs, perceived her as ungrateful for never acknowledging the lifesaving assistance that she had been given. She was also accused of not pulling her weight on climbing expeditions, leaving it to others to fix ropes on difficult sections of mountain or stock higher camps with food and other provisions, and then taking advantage of their work.
   
In the book "No Shortcuts to the Top" Viesturs tells about the discovery of Mauduit's and her Sherpa partner's body in the tent at Camp II of Dhaulagiri. Viesturs writes that initially he was uncertain about the real cause of death, suggesting possible other causes, but then recognises that it was possible that a rockfall or ice had broken the neck of the two climbers. Viesturs was on Dhaulagiri at the time of Mauduit's death, but had no first hand knowledge about how Mauduit died. Chantal Mauduit's body was returned to France and the autopsy concluded that the cause of death was a broken neck. Frederique Delrieu, a climbing companion of both Viesturs and Mauduit, saw Mauduit's body first-hand and confirmed that she had a broken neck.

References

External links 
Association Chantal Mauduit Namaste (in French)

French mountain climbers
1964 births
1998 deaths
Mountaineering deaths
Natural disaster deaths in Nepal
Deaths in avalanches
Tibet freedom activists
Female climbers
Mountaineering deaths in Nepal